Esneyder Mena Perea (born 3 November 1997) is a Colombian footballer who currently plays as a right-back for América de Cali. After a switch of position from right midfield, his technical ability, brilliant crossing and long-range passing led to him being dubbed ‘the Trent Alexander-Arnold of Colombian football’.

Career statistics

Club

Notes

References

1997 births
Living people
Colombian footballers
Colombian expatriate footballers
Association football midfielders
Categoría Primera A players
Ascenso MX players
Tigres UANL footballers
Jaguares de Córdoba footballers
Patriotas Boyacá footballers
Correcaminos UAT footballers
Deportivo Pasto footballers
América de Cali footballers
Expatriate footballers in Mexico
Colombian expatriate sportspeople in Mexico
Sportspeople from Chocó Department